The Aga Khan University Hospital (AKUH) in Nairobi, established in 1958 is a 254-bed long-term care facility offering general medical services, specialist clinics and diagnostic services.

The hospital receives referrals for specialised medical care and diagnostic services from various hospitals and clinics in the region. Founded by the Aga Khan, the hospital provides a broad range of secondary and tertiary care, including diagnosis of disease and team management of patient care.

Facilities
 Aga Khan Development Network

References

External links
 
 
 
 University of Nairobi Finance Department

Hospital buildings completed in 1958
Nairobi
Hospitals in Kenya
Medical education in Kenya
Teaching hospitals
Hospitals established in 1958
Aga Khan University Hospital
1958 establishments in Kenya